Batán or Bataan is a district of the Matina canton, in the Limón province of Costa Rica.

History 
Batán was created on 25 June 1969 by Ley 4345.

Geography 
Batán has an area of  km² and an elevation of  metres.

Locations
Neighborhoods (Barrios): Milla 25
 Villages (Poblados): Barbilla, Berta, Damasco, Davao, Goshen, Leyte, Lola, Luzón, Margarita, Milla 24, Milla 27, Milla 28, Oracabesa, Parcelas, Sahara, Santa Marta, Titán, Vegas

Demographics 

For the 2011 census, Batán had a population of  inhabitants.

Transportation

Road transportation 
The district is covered by the following road routes:
 National Route 32
 National Route 804
 National Route 805

References 

Districts of Limón Province
Populated places in Limón Province